John Cheyne Davidson was a Canadian Anglican priest in the 20th Century.

Davidson was educated at Trinity College, Toronto and ordained in 1885. After a curacy in Teddington he went out to Colborne Parish, New Brunswick After that he worked in the Peterborough area from 1888 until 1932: as curate, incumbent and Archdeacon from 1920.

References

Archdeacons of Peterborough, ON
Trinity College (Canada) alumni
19th-century Canadian Anglican priests
20th-century Canadian Anglican priests